The Sydney Trains K sets are a class of electric multiple units that currently operate on the Sydney Trains network. Built by A Goninan & Co, the K sets first entered service in 1981 operating under the State Rail Authority, and later CityRail. The carriages are of stainless steel, double deck construction and share much of their design with the older S sets. All of the 40 K sets originally built (160 carriages) remain in service and are currently the 2nd oldest in the Sydney Trains fleet.

Design & construction
The K sets were the first New South Wales suburban trains to be air conditioned and have headlights.

Two orders were placed for the K sets with all manufactured between 1981 and 1985 by A Goninan & Co in Broadmeadow:

Order 1
 
Order 2

The first order featured low mounted upper deck windows, cream and brown interiors, and unpainted fronts. The second order featured higher mounted upper deck windows, yellow and mustard interiors and State Rail Authority candy livery fronts.
The first four trailers were built as driving trailers allowing them to operate in two-car formation, although in practice they were formed into four carriage sets and often ran together as one eight-car set until 1988. These also differed in the subsequent deliveries in being fitted with air conditioning from new, rather than pressure ventilation. To provide a spare, C3550 & T4216 were also built with air conditioning. All ten carriages were fitted with different windows, being sheet glass with small opening hoppers. This was replaced with sheet glass in 1993.

To accommodate the air conditioning and associated equipment, the pantograph had to be shifted to the adjacent trailer car to which the power car is semi-permanently coupled with high voltage cables connecting the two cars. Although some power cars and trailers have been broken up and married with others during periods of heavy maintenance, many original combinations remain.

The control carriages have a flat front, with headlights at the top. They were built with four sets of marker lights, standard at the time. Different combinations of white marker lights were used to indicate different destinations. Flip-dot destination displays were installed later on, which covered the upper middle marker light. Since destination displays have been installed, marker light combinations are no longer necessary, so usually only the two upper marker lights are used. However, some trains still retain the switch for the lower marker light. The front of the train also has an emergency door for the guard compartment and windscreen wipers for the driver window only. Hoses and receptacles are provided below the windows to connect another set, since, unlike newer trains, the coupler does not carry electrical or air connections.

Like other trains of the time, the crew compartment contains a smaller compartment for the driver on the left side (in direction of travel). The guard uses the area outside of the driver's compartment, with two manual hinged doors on either side providing access to platforms. Above these doors, on the outside are blue lights indicating which compartment the guard is in.

Each vestibule has two-panel sliding doors on either side. Each door also has a vent underneath the window, which was covered when air-conditioning was installed. The doors cannot detect obstacles and continue pushing against the obstruction until it is removed or the guard reopens the doors. Small orange LEDs are located above the doors on the outside that flash when the doors are closing. They assist the guard in locating doors that haven't closed successfully. All trains were retrofitted with traction interlocking, meaning the driver cannot apply power when the doors are open.

In service
All K sets are crewed with a driver and guard. The guard uses the rear cab on a two or four-car train. On eight car trains, the guard usually uses the 5th carriage so that the entire platform can be seen. However the 4th carriage cab can also be used if there is a problem with the 5th carriage one.

All the K sets were delivered to either Hornsby or Punchbowl depots. With the trials on the ten experimental carriages judged successful, in 1986 a programme commenced to retrofit air conditioning to the second order. This saw the Beclawat windows replaced with sheet glass. It would be July 1990 before the programme was completed.

In April 1989, K sets commenced operating peak-hour services via the North Shore line to Gosford. This was extended to Wyong in January 1992. In September 1990, all Punchbowl based sets were transferred to Hornsby.

In January 1991, four sets were transferred to Flemington Maintenance Depot to operate peak-hour Illawarra line services to Port Kembla.

To replace U sets on stopping services between Gosford and Newcastle, the sets with driving trailers were re-marshaled as two-car sets from October 1996.

Following the delivery of the outer suburban Tangara sets in 1994, the K sets ceased operating the Central Coast and Illawarra services.

During the late 1990s, all were refurbished by A Goninan & Co as part of the CityDecker program. This saw the interiors refurbished with white walls and ceilings, grey floors and blue seats. Power cars received a destination indicator and had yellow applied to the lower half of their fronts. Sliding Beclawat windows on the pressure ventilated cars were replaced with hopper windows and doors painted yellow. The first order was finally retrofitted with air conditioning just prior to the Sydney 2000 Olympics. These cars retained the hopper windows until the late 2000s, but were sealed shut with an adhesive to avoid the loss of air conditioning.

After the introduction of a new timetable in October 2009, all K sets were allocated to Hornsby to operate North Shore, Northern & Western line services, operating in 8-car formations. This was due to the noise levels inside trains when operating on the Epping to Chatswood segment. Older S sets lack sufficient sound insulation for passengers, while newer Tangara sets don't have sufficient cooling in the regenerative braking system to deal with extended shuttle runs through the tunnel.

In mid-2014, K sets are gradually transferred from Hornsby to Flemington resulting in their resumption of service on the Airport, Inner West & South, Bankstown, Carlingford and Olympic Park lines. K60 to K86 were previously running these lines, based out of Flemington Depot. Prior to 2017, K87–99 continued to run part-time on the T1 North Shore, Northern & Western lines.

In October 2013, the 2 car K Sets (K1–4) were withdrawn from NSW TrainLink Gosford to Newcastle services. The four driving trailers were converted to ordinary trailers at Hornsby and the sets returned to service on Sydney Trains services in March 2014 as K98 and K99. The existing K98 was re-numbered K91. The driver cabins in these carriages were stripped of controls however the actual walls were kept intact. The doors to the driver cabin are kept locked and the blinds are kept down. There are no passenger seats where the crew compartment used to be. Also, unlike converted S set cars, the round window on the crew compartment doors were removed and covered with a metal plate.

In July 2017, asbestos was found in the circuit breaker panels, which is inside the driver compartment of the K sets, with all withdrawn for inspection for a few weeks. All have since returned to service.

After the introduction of a new timetable in November 2017, all K sets were transferred to Sector 2.

In late 2017 and early 2018, all K sets and C sets were slightly refurbished with all poles and other safety features repainted yellow.

In 2019, set K96 was withdrawn from passenger service and had Automatic Train Protection (ATP) equipment installed. It has conducted ATP testing since then and will be retained following the retirement of the rest of the fleet for this purpose.

K sets operate on the following lines:
T2 Inner West & Leppington Line: Leppington or Parramatta to City Circle via Granville 
T3 Bankstown Line: Liverpool or Lidcombe to City Circle via Bankstown 
T8 Airport and South Line: Macarthur to City Circle via Airport or Sydenham
They were formerly in operation on the T6 Carlingford line until it was closed in January 2020.

Further reading

References

External links

 Technical diagrams and specifications Transport for NSW

Double-decker EMUs
Electric multiple units of New South Wales
Sydney Trains
Train-related introductions in 1981
1500 V DC multiple units of New South Wales